The 2022 ARIA Music Awards were the 36th Annual Australian Recording Industry Association Music Awards (generally known as ARIA Music Awards or simply The ARIAs) and consist of a series of awards, including the 2022 ARIA Artisan Awards, ARIA Fine Arts Awards and the ARIA Awards. The ARIA Awards ceremony occurred on 24 November 2022, broadcast on Nine Network and live-streamed via YouTube from Hordern Pavilion, Sydney. Modifications were Best Artist became Best Solo Artist, Best Dance/Electronic Release replaced Best Dance Release, Mix Engineer – Best Mixed Album instead of Engineer of the Year and Producer – Best Produced Album changed from Producer of the Year. Entries for all categories closed on 12 August 2022 and final nominees were announced on 12 October.

Hosts for the show were announced as Natalie Imbruglia and Lewis Capaldi on 14 October, however on 2 November Capaldi withdrew "due to unforeseen scheduling issues". His replacements G Flip and Ruel were announced on 14 November. Brooke Boney hosted the Pre-Show and also presented 15  trophies. Ceremony performers were named on 16 November, included were tributes for ARIA Hall of Fame inductees whom have died during the year: Olivia Newton-John (1948–2022), Archie Roach (1956–2022) and Judith Durham (1943–2022). Due to those tributes this year's ceremony had no new ARIA Hall of Fame inductions, for the second consecutive year. Baker Boy won the most trophies with five from six nominations, while Rüfüs Du Sol had the most nominations at seven taking home one.

Performers 

The tribute performance for Archie Roach was introduced by Peter Garrett and Briggs.

Presenters

Nominees and winners

Nominations were announced on 12 October 2022 by Nine Network's entertainment reporter Brooke Boney via ARIA's YouTube channel. Winners of awards during the Pre-Show were also announced by Boney. Winners shown bolded and at top of category, other final nominees are shown in plain.

ARIA Awards

Public voted

Fine Arts Awards

Artisan Awards

References

External links
 

2022 in Australian music
2022 music awards
ARIA Music Awards